Alfred Alvarez Newman (1851 – 21 January 1887), also known as Alfred Abraham, was an English metalworker and art collector.

He was the founder of the picturesque Old English Smithy on Archer Street, Haymarket, which became a place of fashionable resort during the "London season." Among his clients were the Dukes of Westminster and Norfolk, the Marquis of Northampton, Louisa de Rothschild, Coutts Lindsay, and Lawrence Alma-Tadema.

Newman's interests included Anglo-Jewish history and archaeology, and was the author of several papers communicated to the Society of Architects and similar bodies. He possessed a unique collection of Jewish prints and tracts bearing on these subjects, which was acquired by Asher Isaac Meyers after his death.

Newman was an organizer of the Anglo-Jewish Historical Exhibition of 1887, at which much of his collection was exhibited after his death, and was among the first to give his support to the formation of the Jewish Historical Society of England, which was afterwards founded in 1893. It was due largely to Newman's efforts that a proposal to demolish the Bevis Marks Synagogue was eventually defeated.

References

Footnotes 

1851 births
1887 deaths
19th-century antiquarians
19th-century art collectors
19th-century English male writers
19th-century metalsmiths
Antiquarians from London
British metalsmiths
English Jewish writers
English male non-fiction writers
English Sephardi Jews
Ironworkers
Jewish art collectors
Jewish artists